The Belle of Mayfair is a musical comedy composed by Leslie Stuart with a book by Basil Hood, Charles Brookfield and Cosmo Hamilton and lyrics by George Arthurs.  The story is inspired by the Shakespeare play Romeo and Juliet.

The original production opened at the Vaudeville Theatre in London on 11 April 1906, produced by Charles Frohman.  It ran for 431 performances, closing on 13 April 1907, and starred Edna May, Louie Pounds, Arthur Williams, Camille Clifford and Courtice Pounds.  Hood withdrew his name from the original production after Frohman started altering the text to suit casting changes that occurred during the run.  Some of these changes resulted from disputes between the female leads and the management, one of which resulted in court action.  Edna May stormed out of the production, and the role was assumed by Phyllis Dare, making her a star.

Roles and original cast list
Julia Chaldicott (The Belle of Mayfair) – Edna May 
Hon. Raymond Finchley (Julia's lover) – Farren Soutar
Princess Carl of Ehrenbreitstein – Louie Pounds 
Sir John Chaldicott (Julia's father) – Arthur Williams 
Lady Chaldicott (Julia's mother) – Maud Boyd
Hugh Meredith (a bachelor) – Courtice Pounds 
Perrier (Julia's 'official' suitor) – Charles Angelo 
Lord Mount Highgate (Raymond's father) – Sam Walsh 
Countess of Mount Highgate (Raymond's Mother) – Irene Desmond 
Duchess of Dunmow – Camille Clifford 
Captain Theobald – Mervyn Dene 
Lady Violet – Jane May 
Lady Rosaline – Ruby Ray

Synopsis
Act I
A young couple, Julia Chaldicott and Raymond Mount-Highgate, fall madly in love during a sham auction taking place at a bazaar held in a London private park.  This causes alarm to Julia's father, Sir John Chaldicott, Baronet, who hates Raymond's family.  Among the distinguished visitors present at the auction are the Duchess of Dunmow, and Princess Carl of Ehrenbreitstein, a charming English girl, married to a German Prince.  Raymond's friends advise him not to worry about marriage and to enjoy himself instead, while Julia's high powered friends, including Princess Carl, try to get him sent overseas as a diplomat.  Julia's father tries to end the match by announcing that his daughter is going to become engaged to the Comte de Perrier, a conductor of a foreign band that is touring in the vicinity, and he is paid to become Julia's official suitor.  As a result, Raymond threatens to punch the Comte and elope with Julia.

Act II
Sir John and his lady are at the opera, and Julia is being presented at Court by the Princess.  A member of the orchestra brings a bag containing the band leader's costume to Sir John's house. Shortly afterwards, Sir John and Lady Chaldicott return.  Some guests have been invited to meet Julia after her presentation.  Soon Julia enters radiant and beautiful in her Court dress, and before long Raymond arrives to plan the elopement. Raymond shall ask Doctor Marmaduke Lawrence, the Bishop of Brighton, to officiate at the wedding.  They are interrupted in their scheming, and Raymond, on Julia's inspiration, dons the costume of the missing bandmaster and confers with her father as to the programme of music. Sir John disturbed by the bandmaster's apparent change of manner.

Just when everything is arranged, Princess Carl appeals to Julia not to run away with Raymond, as the shock might injure her father's health, and Julia, like a dutiful daughter, consents to wait.  Sir John demands that his daughter give up Raymond entirely and unconditionally.  Julia makes a tender and impassioned appeal that her heart may not be broken, and in the end Sir John gives way. Lord Mount-Highgate and his wife, who arrive to assist in frustrating the elopement, hear Julia declare her love for Raymond, and her father give his consent to the marriage. A general reconciliation takes place, and everything ends happily.

Musical numbers

Act I
 Bells in the Morning – The Belle of Mayfair 
 Eight Little Debutantes Are We – Debutantes 
 I'm a Duchess – Duchess of Dunmow 
 In Gay Mayfair – Julia 
 Welcome to Princess – Chorus 
 Said I to Myself – H.S.H. Princess Carl of Ehbreneitstein 
 Where You Go Will I Go – Julia 
 Come to St. George's – Julia, H.S.H. Princess Carl, Honorable Raymond Finchley and Hugh Meredith 
 Finale – Chorus 

Act II
 My Lady Fair – Stall-holder and Chorus 
 My Little Girl is a Shy Little Girl – The Belle of Mayfair and Comte de Perrier 
 Hello, Come Along Girls – Hugh Meredith, Debutantes and Little Buds 
 We've Come from Court – Julia, H.S.H. Princess Carl, Lady Chaldicott, Comte de Perrier, Sir George Cheatham, K.C. and Guests 
 And the Weeping Willow Wept – H.S.H. Princess Carl 
 The Little Girl at the Sweet Shop – Julia 
 What Makes the Woman? – Honorable Raymond Finchley 
 Why Do They Call Me a Gibson Girl – Duchess of Dunmow, The Earl of Mount Highgate and Debutantes 
 I Know a Girl – Hon. Raymond Finchley, Hugh Meredith, Comte de Perrier, The Earl of Mount Highgate and Sir John Chaldicott, Bart, M.P. 
 Come to St. George's (Finale) – Chorus

References

External links
Cast list, review, photos and other information
Information about the Broadway production
Includes a review of a scene in the London production
Information about shows opening in London in 1906
Guide to Musical Theatre - Belle of Mayfair
www.gabrielleray.150m.com/ArchivePressText2006/20060923.html Information about the Australian production

1906 musicals
West End musicals
Musicals based on plays
Plays and musicals based on Romeo and Juliet
British musicals